Stephan Krüger (born 29 November 1988, Rostock) is a German rower.

He was part of the German quadruple sculls team at the 2008 Summer Olympics, with René Bertram, Hans Gruhne and Christian Schreiber.  The team finished in 6th.

In 2009, he won the gold medal in the men's double sculls with Eric Knittel at the 2009 World Championships.

In 2011, Krüger and Gruhne won silver in the men's double sculls at the World Championships in Bled.

At the 2012 Summer Olympics, he competed in the men's double sculls with Eric Knittel, finishing in 9th.

At the 2016 Summer Olympics in Rio de Janeiro, he competed in men's double sculls with teammate Marcel Hacker. They finished in 8th place.  Hacker and Krüger had won silver in the event at the 2016 European Championships on home water in Brandenburg, after winning the event at the 2015 European Championships.  Krüger had also won bronze in the event with Gruhne in 2014.

References

External links
 }

1988 births
Living people
Rowers from Rostock
Olympic rowers of Germany
Rowers at the 2008 Summer Olympics
Rowers at the 2012 Summer Olympics
Rowers at the 2016 Summer Olympics
Rowers at the 2020 Summer Olympics
World Rowing Championships medalists for Germany
German male rowers
European Rowing Championships medalists